Walter Fischer (21 February 1889 – 3 April 1959) was a German international footballer.

References

1889 births
1959 deaths
Association football forwards
German footballers
Germany international footballers